Parliamentary elections were held in Hungary on 6 April 2014. This parliamentary election was the 7th since the 1990 first multi-party election. The result was a victory for the Fidesz–KDNP alliance, preserving its two-thirds majority, with Viktor Orbán remaining Prime Minister. It was the first election under the new Constitution of Hungary which came into force on 1 January 2012. The new electoral law also entered into force that day. For the first time since Hungary's transition to democracy, the election had a single round. The voters elected 199 MPs instead of the previous 386 lawmakers.

Background
In the 2010 parliamentary elections Fidesz won a landslide victory, with Viktor Orbán being elected as Prime Minister. As a result of this election, his government was able to alter the National Constitution, as he garnered a two-thirds majority. The government was able to write a constitutional article that favored traditional marriages, as well as one that lowered the number of MPs elected from 386 to 199.

Orbán and his government remained relatively popular in the months leading to the election. This was largely because of high GDP growth, increased industrial output, and a growth in the tourism sector.

New constitution and electoral law 
In 2010, a new government led by Fidesz initiated a drafting process for a new constitution. On 18 April 2011, parliament approved the constitution on a 262–44 vote, with Fidesz and their Christian Democrat coalition partners in favor and Jobbik opposed. The Hungarian Socialist Party (MSZP) and Politics Can Be Different (LMP), citing the ruling party's unwillingness to compromise on issues and their inability to change the outcome, boycotted both the drafting process and the vote. On 25 April, President Pál Schmitt signed the document into law, and it entered into force on the first day of 2012. The enactment came halfway through Hungary's six-month Presidency of the Council of the European Union.

A new electoral law was also passed on 23 December 2011. The Fidesz and its coalition partner Christian Democratic People's Party (KDNP) unilaterally approved the new bill, using their two-thirds majority, ignoring the left-wing opposition's (MSZP and LMP) protests, while Jobbik voted against it. The NGO Political Capital noted in its analysis that the newly-adopted law "shifts the election system towards the majoritarian principle", which may be the cause of possible future "disproportional" outcomes in favour of individual parliamentary seats, resulting an emergence of voting method like first-past-the-post voting (FPTP). Nevertheless, Political Capital also emphasized that this tendency "however [can] not be interpreted as an injury to democracy."

Voter registration plan 
On 26 November 2012, Fidesz used its supermajority to pass legislation revising eligibility for voting. Accordingly, the citizens, who had to right to vote, should have been involved in a pre-registration process no later than 15 days before polling day "in order to spare politically indifferent citizens from the election campaign", as Fidesz officials said. According to critics, this process would have made it harder to vote the party out of power, while also threatened free suffrage with the determination of the time limit. Four members of the Democratic Coalition (DK), including its leader, former Prime Minister Ferenc Gyurcsány, had participated in a week-long hunger strike, protesting against the proposed voter registration plan, while President János Áder, who took the office after the resignation of Schmitt and himself was also a Fidesz member, sent the bill to the Constitutional Court.

On 3 January 2013, the Court ruled that the law curtailed voting rights to an "unjustifiable degree", due to the fact that the requirement for voters to register prior to going to the polls applies to every voter. The court also argued the limitation of campaign advertisings into the public broadcasting (Magyar Televízió and its partners), the proposed bans of political advertisements on cinemas during the campaign as well as prohibition of opinion polls in the last six days of the campaign "threatens" the freedom of speech in Hungary, in addition to its unconstitutional nature. After the court's decision the head of the Fidesz parliamentary group, Antal Rogán, announced his party "would drop the proposal" and they will not introduce it for the 2014 parliamentary election, despite the fact that some party members had considered just before the court's ruling that is possible that constitutional amendments can take place in order to pass the bill.

Party splits after 2010 election 

After the 2010 local elections, held on 3 October, Katalin Szili, former Speaker of the National Assembly founded the Social Union party and became its first chairperson. As a result, she quit the Hungarian Socialist Party (MSZP) and the party's parliamentary group, continuing her work as a formally independent MP. In October 2011, a group of members of the MSZP around former Prime Minister Ferenc Gyurcsány left the party and founded the Democratic Coalition (DK) after one year of tension and disagreement. Ten members of the parliament, including Gyurcsány, also left the MSZP parliamentary group and became independent MPs. Gyurcsány said the cause of secession was that the MSZP "had failed in its efforts to transform itself". His former Socialist colleagues strongly condemned his step, as Gyurcsány signed a statement not to quit the party, swearing allegiance to the new party leadership just one week before leaving. At the introduction of his new movement, Gyurcsány called the new constitution as "illegitimate", and charged that all branches of power such as the Constitutional Court, Chief Prosecutor Péter Polt and other units of the judicial system "exclusively serve Viktor Orbán".

Since its establishment and 2010 national election, LMP was kept under pressure (for instance, on the occasion of by-elections) by the Hungarian Socialist Party to achieve some kind of electoral compromise and cooperation against Viktor Orbán's government. The leadership of the LMP positioned the party to the centre, and, as a newcomer, rejected both Fidesz and MSZP's politics. Prominent party member András Schiffer also criticized the previous Socialist cabinets, blaming Gyurcsány's "disastrous governance" for Fidesz winning a two-thirds majority in 2010. However prominent politicians in LMP were divided on the issue of cooperation. During the party's congress in November 2012, LMP decided not to join Together 2014, the planned electoral alliance of opposition parties and movements led by Gordon Bajnai. As a result, Benedek Jávor, a proponent of the agreement, resigned from his position of parliamentary group leader. Jávor and his supporters (including Tímea Szabó and Gergely Karácsony) founded a platform within the party, called "Dialogue for Hungary" on 26 November 2012. The platform argued in favour of conclusion of an electoral agreement with Bajnai's movement in order to replace "Orbán's regime". In January 2013, the LMP's congress rejected again the electoral cooperation with other opposition parties, including Together 2014. As a result, members of the party's "Dialogue for Hungary" platform left LMP to form a new political organization. Benedek Jávor announced the eight leaving MPs would not resign from their parliamentary seats, while seven parliamentarians (Schiffer's supporters) remained in the party. The leaving MPs founded the Dialogue for Hungary as an officially registered party in March 2013. On 8 March 2013, the PM established an electoral coalition with the Together, which was formed as a political party on that day.

In January 2013, two independent MPs who were elected from the Jobbik's national list but were expelled or resigned from the party earlier (Zsolt Endrésik and Ernő Rozgonyi) announced that they would henceforth represent the Hungarian Justice and Life Party (MIÉP) in the National Assembly. MIÉP had parliamentary representation the last time in 2002.

Opposition cooperation negotiations 
Gordon Bajnai, who served as Prime Minister between 2009 and 2010, preceding Orbán, announced his return to politics on 23 October 2012, during the anti-government demonstration of the One Million for Press Freedom (Milla) non-governmental organization. On the protest, he called for an anti-Orbán coalition so as to form a supermajority in Parliament with the help of which the changes done by Orbán's ruling party, Fidesz could be undone.

In his speech, Bajnai repeatedly used a variant of the term ("We may fail on our own, but together, we shall prove victorious!"), when he proclaimed his support for such a "cooperation between hopeful left-wingers, disappointed rightwingers, politically abandoned free-thinkers and committed Greens" that his organization along with two other civilian body named Together 2014 as a reference to the date of the next general elections in Hungary. In December 2012, Bajnai announced that he intends to become a Member of Parliament in the 2014 national election. Medián polled 22 then 16 percent for the first time to the Together movement among the "certain" voters in their two November surveys. Several scholars criticized the Medián's questioning method which was different from previous ones, suspecting a political intent behind the surveys.

According to plans, Together 2014 would have been an umbrella organization of centre-left parties, similar to the Olive Tree in Italy which established against Silvio Berlusconi's right-wing coalition in 1995. However LMP had rejected the cooperation in November 2012 and January 2013, and the Socialists led by Attila Mesterházy gradually took over the initiative. Consequently, the Together movement transformed itself into party on 8 March 2013, as only parties could take part in the election according to the rules. On the same day, the Dialogue for Hungary, which was founded by deserters from the LMP, has established an electoral coalition with the Together.

2013 agreement 
In late August 2013, Socialist and Together party leaders agreed to nominate joint individual candidates in each constituency, but would register separate national lists for the upcoming parliamentary election. To avoid the escalation of personal conflicts of interest, they decided not to appoint a joint candidate for the position of Prime Minister; it was announced that party leader, whose party would become the strongest government force following the election, will automatically gain the office. Socialist leader Attila Mesterházy told public television M1 that the electoral alliance between the MSZP and the E14–PM on fielding a single centre-left candidate in each individual constituency provides the right basis for success. Mesterházy and Bajnai agreed MSZP will field candidates in 75 out of all the country's 106 individual constituencies and the E14–PM in the remaining 31. The agreement was sharply criticised by the Democratic Coalition, which was excluded from the cooperation. Gyurcsány called it as a "failure" and said that party leaders Mesterházy and Bajnai "spoofed themselves, us and, finally, the democratic Hungary". Fidesz spokesman Péter Hoppál said this agreement showed that the opposition parties were unable to learn from their own past mistakes. "They were fired by the majority of voters [in 2010] not because they were leftists but because they placed their personal ambitions above the interests of the country", he added.

In September 2013, the Socialist Party declined to sign an election deal with the Democratic Coalition and Gábor Fodor's Hungarian Liberal Party because "both parties presented excessive expectations compared to their social support", according to Attila Mesterházy. The party chairman told a forum held at the party HQ, broadcast by left-wing commercial news channel ATV, that in order to win next year's election, the Socialists need to win over uncertain voters. The party board declared that running with Gyurcsány, one of the most unpopular politicians, would keep uncertain voters away, he added. In response, Gyurcsány said the MSZP had proposed cooperation in four instead of nine constituencies, all of which were impossible to win. In addition they offered every 25th place on their party list and would have banned Gyurcsány himself from running either individually or on a list. Another request was that DK should not present a platform of its own, while nominating its candidates to the MSZP national list. The party could not accept these conditions, the politician said.

2014 agreement 

Gordon Bajnai said on 6 January 2014, he plans to hold talks with Socialist Party on expanding and further developing an agreement between the opposition parties. "We must give back faith in victory to all those that want a change of government. We believe that this requires the closest cooperation, with the possibility of a joint list, between opposition forces with considerable public support. In order to achieve this, each participant must make sacrifices," the party said in a statement sent to MTI, quoting a recent television interview with Bajnai. This meant creating an opportunity to include DK in the electoral cooperation made the last year. Following that the two parties began negotiations to expand their electoral agreement; "we should make every possible effort to oust Fidesz from power, and reach an agreement that would help canvas undecided voters", said Viktor Szigetvári, co-leader of the Together 2014. "There should be a single left-wing candidate in each of the 106 constituencies, and no vote cast on an opposition candidate should go lost", he added.

The Socialist Party and the Together concluded an agreement on 8 January 2014 in order to set a joint list for the upcoming parliamentary election. Accordingly, MSZP acquired the right to nominate the common prime minister, likely to be Attila Mesterházy, who has previously expressed his intention to run for the office. Mesterházy announced they will propose to join the Democratic Coalition and he said the agreement could succeed. Ferenc Gyurcsány welcomed the agreement and said DK is ready to begin tripartite negotiations immediately. Gyurcsány also announced on Facebook that he would interrupt his freedom abroad and travel home immediately. These took place already the next day. Because of Gyurcsány's involvement, Péter Juhász, the leader of the Milla (a component of the Together alliance) offered his resignation and stepped down from his party's national list (but remained an individual candidate in Belváros-Lipótváros).

Fidesz spokeswoman Gabriella Selmeczi called the left-wing party list "completely irrelevant" for the election, because "they are all the same old people, with no new face among them." She said that "they are the same people who have already ruined Hungary once." The radical nationalist Jobbik said the agreement between the Socialists and Together–PM demonstrated the "rebirth of the coalition of lies." In the current situation, Hungarian voters can only choose between the politicians who destroyed Hungary in the past 24 years (i.e. Fidesz and left-wing opposition) or Jobbik that will bring a change, spokeswoman Dóra Dúró said. "When replacing Orbán's government, Jobbik will not bring Gyurcsány back to power", she added. The minor opposition LMP party will not enter any electoral alliance with political forces that used to be in power, party co-leader András Schiffer emphasized. He added, the green party insists on its original position and offers an alternative to those who wished the Gyurcsány and Bajnai governments "would go to hell" in 2010 and also to those who are now fed up with the "regime of national cynicism." (i.e. the Orbán government).

On 14 January 2014, the left-wing opposition parties agreed to submit a joint list for the spring general election, party leaders announced during a press conference. Accordingly, the national list was headed by MSZP party chairman Attila Mesterházy, who also became candidate of the electoral cooperation for the position of prime minister. In the national list, Mesterházy was followed by two former prime ministers, Gordon Bajnai, informal leader of the Together–Dialogue alliance and Ferenc Gyurcsány, leader of the Democratic Coalition (DK). Gábor Fodor, leader of the minor extra-parliamentary Hungarian Liberal Party was put to the fourth place, while co-chair of the Together–Dialogue alliance Tímea Szabó came to the fifth place on the joint list of the five opposition parties. Under the agreement, the Socialists were able to nominate their candidates in 71 individual constituencies, while the Together–PM altogether 22 and DK 13. Antal Rogán, leader of the Fidesz parliamentary group, said the result of the agreement is that the Hungarian left has been unable to nominate "a real prime minister candidate" or "present any new face," according to MTI.

Electoral system 

The electoral laws were changed in 2012. The following significant changes have been issued in the electoral system:

 One round system, which replaced the pre-existing two round system (and this eliminated the possibility of the candidates stepping back in favor of each other between the two rounds).
 No 50%, nor 25% turnout is necessary. (formerly 50% turnout was needed for the first round and 25% for the second round)
 199 seats (decreased from 386, so the number of seats is 51.6% of the original)
 106 constituency seats (decreased from 176, increased from 45.6% to 53.3% of all seats)
 93 party-list seats, including minority-list seats (decreased from the 210 regional (county) and national list seats which were merged, decreased from 54.4% to 46.7% of all seats)
 5% threshold still exists in case of party-list, and 10% in case of two parties' joint list, 15% in case of three or more parties' joint list.
 Minorities will be able to set a minority-list, on the elections they only need to reach the 5% threshold out of all minority votes, and not out of all party-list votes, which – practically – makes it possible to send only few minority representatives (maybe only one) to the National Assembly (for about 1% of all votes, minorities can send MPs to the National Assembly)

Every citizen has two votes – one to vote for a constituency candidate and one to vote for a party list. The 106 constituency seats are distributed by a one-round plurality system, meaning simply, that the candidate receiving most votes gets elected (compared to the previous two-round majority-plurality system).
The distribution of 93 party-list seats is based both on the results of the party and constituency votes. To total of the votes for party-lists, some constituency-votes are added. This happens in two ways:
 First, votes that were cast for all constituency candidates that didn’t get elected are added to the respective parties of those candidates.
 Second, part of the votes for the victorious constituency candidates is transferred to their parties. Number of transferred votes equals to Number of votes won by the winning candidate minus number of votes won by the second candidate minus one. The logic behind the formula is to transfer all the votes that the winning candidate didn’t actually need to secure election. E.g. if the first candidate receives 15 000 votes and the second 5 000, the winner would have won even if he received 9 999 fewer votes, than he actually did. These votes are thus added to the party total for distribution of nation-wide party list seats. Based on these votes totals, the seats are than distributed among parties by d’Hondt formula.

Minorities, that will not reach the 5% threshold (out of all minority-list votes, not out of all votes) or will not get at least one seat, will be able to send a minority spokesman to the National Assembly from 2014, who has right only to speak but not to vote. The obtaining one seat out of 93 is much more difficult for minorities than reaching the 5% threshold for minority votes because a seat represents slightly more than 1% of all party and minority lists (while 5% of minority votes are expected to be much less than 1% of all votes, as the number of minority voters is well below 20%). This minority spokesperson solution gives minorities the opportunity to speak in Parliament, even if they are unable to obtain about 1% of all votes. In practice, the German and Roma minorities have a chance to obtain MPs (according to the latest census), and the other 13 minorities will have a minority spokesperson, guaranteeing their representation in parliament.

The right to vote is first extended to Hungarian citizens who do not have a permanent residence in Hungary (i.e. mostly the Hungarian diaspora in the neighboring countries); however, they can only vote for the national list of Hungarian parties, so they do not have a chance to vote in individual constituencies.

Candidates

Registered parties

Individual candidates 
The National Election Office announced that a total of 2,304 candidates submitted the required number of nominations for the parliamentary election by the 3 p.m. deadline on 4 March. The candidacy of 1,531 people was accepted after completion of the registration process. The following table contains a selected list of numbers of individual candidates by county representation and party affiliation:

National lists
Under the new election law, parties which ran individual candidates in at least 27 constituencies in Budapest and at least nine counties had the opportunity to set up a national list. On 21 February 2014, the National Election Committee (NVB) registered at first the joint list of the governing Fidesz–KDNP party alliance, led by PM Viktor Orbán and KDNP president Zsolt Semjén.

Eighteen national party lists were registered up to 8 March 2014, when the National Election Office (NVI) approved the following 14 organizations (parties and electoral alliances), in addition to the parliamentary parties (Fidesz–KDNP, Unity, Jobbik and LMP), which had already successfully registered: Homeland Not For Sale Movement Party (HNEM), the communist Hungarian Workers' Party, Party for a Fit and Healthy Hungary (SEM), Andor Schmuck's Social Democratic Civic Party (Soc Dems), the former long-time parliamentary party Independent Smallholders, Agrarian Workers and Civic Party (FKGP), former House Speaker and Socialist party member Katalin Szili's Community for Social Justice People's Party (KTI), Gypsy Party of Hungary (MCP), Party of Greens (Greens), New Dimension Party (ÚDP), New Hungary Party (ÚMP), Together 2014 Party, Democratic Community of Welfare and Freedom (JESZ), Unity Party (ÖP) and Alliance of Mária Seres (SMS). The following table contains only the incumbent parliamentary parties' national lists (first 20 members), which won mandates in the election:

Minority lists
Under the election law, the thirteen officially recognized national minorities are entitled to send minority spokespersons to the National Assembly. They have the same rights as other parliamentarians to address the parliament, but are not entitled to vote. However the minorities could also each set up national lists. If any such national list reached the 5% electoral threshold from minority votes, this would entitle them to full-fledged representatives.

The Polish minority list was the first minority list to be successfully registered by the National Election Committee (NVB), on 25 February 2014. Two days later, on 27 February, the NVB registered three other national lists: those for the German, Rusyn and Serb minorities, and then approved the lists of Armenians and Romanians on 1 March, Bulgarians and Slovaks on 3 March, Croats, Ukrainians and Romani people on 4 March, and, finally, Greeks and Slovenes on 7 March.

The officially recognized minority self-government organizations received a total of 298.5 million Ft (EUR 954,000) of public support for campaign activity. The National Roma Council was awarded a significant portion of the funds – altogether 101 million forints – while the Bulgarians granted the lowest amount (8.4 million), according to official demographic ratios.

Opinion polls

Methodological note: The Hungarian pollsters generally release separate data on the support of political parties among all eligible voters (which tends to include a high percentage for "don't know/no preference"), and on the support of political parties among "active" or "certain" voters. The table below refers to the latter data.

Results

Party list results by county and in the diaspora

Reactions

Domestic 
Fidesz's leader Viktor Orbán celebrated in Budapest with thousands of supporters in the evening and said that Hungary was on the threshold of a "new and wonderful epoch".

Jobbik leader Gábor Vona said that the party is now the "strongest national radical party" in the EU, as well as Hungary’s second largest political party". Jobbik continuously increases it popularity and ahead of the European parliament elections it is important to make this clear. [Yet even though] we outperformed pollsters’ expectations, but we were not able to achieve the goal we set for ourselves of winning the elections".

One of the five party alliance's leaders, Gordon Bajnai, said the result was a "crushing defeat" and a "great disappointment" for those who wanted change.

International 
The Office for Democratic Institutions and Human Rights Limited Election Observation Mission found that the elections were "efficiently administered and offered voters a diverse choice following an inclusive candidate registration process" but that Fidesz "enjoyed an undue advantage because of restrictive campaign regulations, biased media coverage and campaign activities that blurred the separation between political party and the State".

See also
2014 European Parliament election in Hungary
2014 Hungarian local elections
List of members of the National Assembly of Hungary (2014–18)

Notes

References

Elections in Hungary
Hungary
Parliamentary